Dead Man's Eyes is a 1944 Inner Sanctum film noir mystery film directed by Reginald Le Borg, and starring Lon Chaney, Jr. and Jean Parker. The film was distributed by Universal Pictures. The "Inner Sanctum" franchise originated with a popular radio series and all of the films star Lon Chaney, Jr.

Plot
Artist Dave Stuart is blinded by a jealous assistant. The father of his fiancé offers an operation to restore his sight, but Stuart will have to wait until the man dies. The benefactor dies a premature death and Stuart becomes a suspect.

Cast
 Lon Chaney Jr. as David 'Dave' Stuart (as Lon Chaney)
 Acquanetta as Tanya Czoraki
 Jean Parker as Heather 'Brat' Hayden
 Paul Kelly as Dr. Alan Bittaker
 Thomas Gomez as Capt. Drury
 Jonathan Hale as Dr. Sam Welles
 Edward Fielding as Dr. Stanley 'Dad' Hayden
 George Meeker as Nick Phillips
 Pierre Watkin as The Lawyer

See also
List of American films of 1944

References

External links 

 
 
 

1944 films
1944 horror films
American black-and-white films
Films based on radio series
Films directed by Reginald Le Borg
American mystery films
Universal Pictures films
1944 mystery films
American horror films
Films scored by Paul Sawtell
Films about blind people
1940s English-language films
1940s American films